Conspiracy theories regarding the 2010 Haiti earthquake are covered at:
Pat Robertson controversies#Remarks about 2010 Haiti earthquake
Antisemitic canard#Haiti
HAARP#Conspiracy theories